Presidential elections were held in Bolivia on 4 May 1913, electing a new President of the Republic.

Results

President

References

Presidential elections in Bolivia
Bolivia
Legislative election
Single-candidate elections
May 1913 events
Election and referendum articles with incomplete results